Dubrow’s (dubrow’s) was a family owned chain of cafeteria-style restaurants in Manhattan, Brooklyn, and Miami Beach. Dubrow’s was established on the Lower East Side of New York City in 1929 by Benjamin Dubrow (né Mowsoha Bencian Dubrowensky), an immigrant from Minsk, Belarus. Benjamin was married to Rose Solowey from the country now known as Belarus. They had five children: George, Minnie, Lila, Sylvia and Ruth.

George (who married Fannie Feldman and had three children: Irwin, Helene, and Leonard), together with his brothers in law, Max Tobin (who married Minnie and had three children: Sheila, Paul, and Anita), Benjamin Adler (who married Lila and had two sons: Joseph and Robert), Irving Kaplan (who married Sylvia and had three daughters: Beth Wald,  Bonnie Lyons, and Laura Levin) and their descendants went on to establish and operate four new cafeterias and bakeries, three restaurants, a take-out shop, and Toby’s, a southern style chain of cafeterias in Florida.  Ruth, George’s youngest sister, who married Seymour Gruber, a physician, had three children, Michael, Steven, and Joanne.

When George Dubrow died in an automobile accident in Florida, his eldest son Irwin assumed his responsibilities in managing Dubrow’s. Irwin’s brother Leonard subsequently joined him. In the following years, Paul Tobin took over for his father, and Joseph and Robert Adler worked part-time with their father. Irving Kaplan stayed with Dubrow’s until the last location’s closing.

Dubrow's was a New York City landmark for many decades with restaurants in both Manhattan and Brooklyn and later in Miami Beach.

There were two Dubrow’s Cafeterias in Brooklyn, one on Kings Highway and one on Eastern Parkway. The Dubrow’s Cafeteria in Miami Beach was located on Lincoln Road. The Manhattan Dubrow's was an important part of New York's Garment district in the early- to mid-twentieth century. It was a hub of activity for the International Ladies' Garment Workers' Union.

Many famous politicians used both the Brooklyn and the Manhattan locations as stumping spots for their political campaigns. These included Presidents John F. Kennedy, and Jimmy Carter when they were running for office, Robert F. Kennedy, and Hugh Carey and W. Averell Harriman, both former governors of New York.  According to multiple biographies, baseball player Sandy Koufax announced his decision to sign with the Brooklyn Dodgers in front of Dubrow's Cafeteria on Kings Highway in Brooklyn. The children's author Bruce Coville also wrote about working at Dubrow's for a brief period of time.  The Manhattan Dubrow's was the site of the American Playhouse production "The Cafeteria", based on the short story (today online here) by Isaac Bashevis Singer, which was featured on PBS.

The last Dubrow's, located in the Garment District in Manhattan, closed in 1985.

Dubrow's Cafeteria in popular culture
A photograph by Garry Winogrand entitled "Kennedy-Nixon Presidential Campaign, New York, 1960" features Dubrow's prominently.
The novel Subway Music by Reynold Junker features a nostalgic passage about Dubrow's being gone
The poem "Waitress" by Jason Shinder claims to be set in Dubrow's, though there were no waitresses in Dubrow's.
The poem "You Could Live If They Let You" by Wallace Markfield features the lines "As I might speak of e. e. cummings enormous room or Swann's Madeline you speak of Dubrow's Cafeteria and Mallomars."
Ivan Koota did several paintings of Dubrow's in his collection of works depicting his native Brooklyn.
Dennis Ziemienski has a painting of Dubrow's Cafeteria.
Parts of the 1979 Film "Boardwalk" were filmed on location in the Dubrow's Cafeteria pictured above in this article shortly after it closed.
The novel Revolutionaries by Joshua Furst references a character who is the wife of Abby Hoffman scrounging for food at Dubrow's in Manhattan.

External links
 Compilation of Dubrow's stories, memories, photographs, and paintings assembled by Benjamin Dubrow's great granddaughter, Eve Lyons

References

Restaurants established in 1929
1985 disestablishments in New York (state)
Defunct restaurants in New York City
Cafeteria-style restaurants
Defunct restaurant chains in the United States
1929 establishments in New York City